The Return of the Magnificent Seven is the second collaborative album between Motown label-mates The Supremes and Four Tops, released in 1971. The production only featured two covers compared to their first album together, The Magnificent 7, that included more than eight. Although the three albums the Supremes recorded with the Four Tops did not match the commercial success of the Supremes/Temptations duet albums (ironically loaded with covers), what they did have instead were original tunes, soulful lead vocals by Jean Terrell and Levi Stubbs and high production values in terms of arrangements and orchestration.

This second release is probably the best of the three Supremes/Four Tops albums. It includes two early songs by Dino Fekaris (who would go on to compose "I Will Survive") and Nick Zesses that were released as singles: "You Gotta Have Love in Your Heart" (in the United States, United Kingdom, West Germany, Italy and Netherlands) and "I'll Try Not to Cry" (in France and Netherlands). Both songs were produced by Clay McMurray and had on their flip sides tunes by Nick Ashford and Valerie Simpson: respectively, the romantic ballad "I'm Glad About It" and the up-tempo, Latin-flavored "One More Bridge to Cross", a typical Ashford & Simpson song with a social commentary. McMurray also produced Tom Baird's "I Wonder Where We're Going" (sung almost collectively by the seven singers) and his own composition, "Where Would I Be Without You Baby". Veteran producer Henry Cosby was in charge of a cover of Petula Clark's hit "Call Me" (written by Tony Hatch); a smooth love song of his own, "If You Could See Me Now", and a third contribution by Zesses and Fekaris, the ballad "Let's Make Love Now". Johnny Bristol produced a remake of Tammi Terrell's solo hit, "I Can't Believe You Love Me", and Bobby Taylor closed the album with a happy ballad about puzzling lovers, written by Pam Sawyer and Gloria Jones, "What Do You Have to Do (To Stay on the Right Side of Love)", also featuring solo vocals by Mary Wilson.

A collection of compositions handled with the expertise of the Motown production machine, supervised by late Rev. Frank Wilson.

Critical reception

In a contemporary review Cashbox published:
'What was that you were saying about supergroups and supersessions? Give a listen to what may be the last word on the subjects. Joining together of these two dynamic groups results in an LP which is chock full of excitement and charm. "You Gotta Have Love In Your Heart" kicks the set off and it's non-stop action all, the way through as the seven take on a bevy of new songs, along with the standard "Call Me." Should find a ready following among fans of both groups.'

Track listing 
"You Gotta Have Love in Your Heart" (Nick Zesses, Dino Fekaris)
"I Wonder Where We're Going" (Tom Baird)
"Call Me" (Tony Hatch)
"One More Bridge to Cross" (Nickolas Ashford, Valerie Simpson)
"If You Could See Me Now" (Janie Bradford, Joe Hinton, Henry Cosby)
"I'll Try Not to Cry" (Nick Zesses, Dino Fekaris)
"I'm Glad About It" (Nickolas Ashford, Valerie Simpson)
"Let's Make Love Now" (Nick Zesses, Dino Fekaris)
"I Can't Believe You Love Me" (Harvey Fuqua, Johnny Bristol)
"Where Would I Be Without You Baby" (Clarence McMurray, Martin Coleman)
"What Do You Have to Do (To Stay on the Right Side of Love)" (Pam Sawyer, Leon Ware)

Personnel
Jean Terrell - vocals
Mary Wilson - vocals
Cindy Birdsong - vocals
Levi Stubbs - vocals
Abdul "Duke" Fakir - vocals
Lawrence Payton - vocals
Renaldo "Obie" Benson - vocals
Frank Wilson - producer, executive producer 
The Funk Brothers - instrumentation
David Van DePitte, Henry Cosby, Paul Riser, Tom Baird - arrangers

Chart history

References

1971 albums
The Supremes albums
Four Tops albums
Collaborative albums
Albums arranged by Paul Riser
Albums produced by Frank Wilson (musician)
Motown albums